The Graham Avenue Line and Tompkins Avenue Line were two public transit lines in Brooklyn, New York City with the Graham Avenue Line running mainly along Graham Avenue and Manhattan Avenue and the Tompkins Avenue Line running mainly along Tompkins Avenue. The Graham Avenue line ran between Downtown Brooklyn and Greenpoint and the Tompkins Avenue Line ran between Prospect Lefferts Gardens and Williamsburg. Originally streetcar lines, they were replaced by the B47 and B62 bus routes which were then combined to form the B43 route which currently operates between Prospect-Lefferts Gardens and Greenpoint. The line is dispatched from Jackie Gleason Depot in Sunset Park, Brooklyn.

Route description
The B43 bus route runs between Lincoln Road near Ocean Avenue and the Prospect Park subway station in Prospect-Lefferts Gardens and Manhattan Avenue and Box Street in Greenpoint via Manhattan Avenue, Graham Avenue, and Tompkins Avenue at all times.

The B43 begins at the Prospect Park station and runs on Ocean Avenue until it becomes Empire Boulevard, running on Empire Boulevard until Brooklyn and Kingston Avenues.It runs southbound on Brooklyn Avenue and northbound on Kingston Avenue until Fulton Street, where it switches to Tompkins and Throop Avenues, respectively. It runs on Tompkins and Throop Avenues until Flushing Avenue. It runs on Flushing Avenue until Graham Avenue, which it runs on until Engert and Driggs Avenues until Manhattan Avenue. It then runs up Manhattan Avenue until Box Street, where it terminates.

History

Trolley service
The Brooklyn City Railroad opened the line, as the Flushing Avenue Line, in July 1854 as a branch of the Fulton Street Line continuing east along Flushing Avenue to Throop Avenue with an extension to Division Avenue (present-day Broadway) in April 1855. It was later extended north along Graham Avenue to North Second Street (present-day Metropolitan Avenue) in 1867 and to Van Cott Avenue (present-day Driggs Avenue) in October 1872.

On April 27, 1890, Brooklyn City opened new trackage on Flushing Avenue from Graham Avenue east to Metropolitan Avenue, with the service operating on it becoming the new Flushing Avenue Line, and the old Flushing Avenue Line being renamed the Flushing and Graham Avenues Line and afterwards, the Graham Avenue Line. The Graham Avenue Line was later extended north along existing trackage on Driggs Avenue and Manhattan Avenue to Hunters Point.

Bus service
Buses on the Graham Avenue Line were substituted for streetcars on December 21, 1948, and the route was renumbered the B62.

The B47 trolley was replaced with electric trolley buses and ran on Kingston Avenue in both directions (it was a two-way street) to Williamsburgh Bridge Plaza via Tompkins, Division, and Lee Avenues.  During the heavy snowfalls in the 1950s, the electric buses had difficulty making it up the Kingston Avenue hill, and were seen backed up on Empire Boulevard in columns. 

When the north-south avenues in Brooklyn were converted to one way in the early 1960s, the B47 went north on Kingston Avenue and south on Brooklyn Avenue until Empire Blvd. The electric trolleybuses were replaced first with “old look” GMC buses, and later with “new-look” GMC buses.

On September 10, 1995, the B62 was merged with the B47 to form the present-day B43 route. The B47 had replaced the Tompkins Avenue Line running between Prospect-Lefferts Gardens and Williamsburg along Empire Boulevard, Kingston Avenue, Tompkins Avenue, and Harrison Avenue. When the routes were combined, the Harrison Avenue portion of the B47 was removed, along with the Flushing Avenue section of the B62. The B43 was moved to the Grand Avenue Depot when it opened in 2008 but was moved back to the Jackie Gleason Depot by early 2011. 

On December 1, 2022, the MTA released a draft redesign of the Brooklyn bus network. As part of the redesign, southbound service in Bedford–Stuyvesant would be rerouted along Albany Avenue and Marcus Garvey Boulevard to serve areas without existing bus service. Closely spaced stops would also be eliminated.

See also
 Greenpoint and Williamsburgh Railroad
 Crosstown Line (Brooklyn surface)

References

Streetcar lines in Brooklyn
B043
B043